Ernest Wadsworth (30 September 1850 – 7 January 1918) was an English cricketer active from 1871 to 1879 who played for Lancashire. He was born in Manchester and died in Hale, Cheshire. He appeared in seven first-class matches as a righthanded batsman, scoring 69 runs with a highest score of 30 and held one catch.

Notes

1850 births
1918 deaths
English cricketers
Lancashire cricketers